Admiral Davidson may refer to:

Glenn V. Davidson (born 1952), Royal Canadian Navy vice admiral
John F. Davidson (1908–1989), U.S. Navy rear admiral
Lyal A. Davidson (1886–1950), U.S. Navy vice admiral
Philip S. Davidson (born 1960), U.S. Navy admiral
Tina A. Davidson (born 1960), U.S. Navy rear admiral